Sir James Oxenden, 2nd Baronet (4 April 1641 – 29 September 1708), of Dene, Kent was an English politician who sat in the House of Commons between 1679 and 1702.

Oxenden was the son of Sir Henry Oxenden, 1st Baronet and his second wife Elizabeth Meredith, daughter of Sir William Meredith of Leeds Abbey, Kent. He was knighted on 22 March 1671.

Oxenden sat as a Member of Parliament for Sandwich from 1679 to 1685 and from 1689 to 1690. He succeeded his father as second Baronet in August 1686. Oxenden was then  MP for Kent from 1698 to 1701 and MP for Sandwich again from 1701 to 1702. 
 
Oxenden died aged sixty-seven.

Oxenden married firstly Elizabeth Chute, daughter of Edward Chute of Bethersden, and secondly, Arabella Watson sister of Lewis Earl of Rockingham. He had no children and was succeeded in the baronetcy by his brother.

References

1641 births
1708 deaths
Baronets in the Baronetage of England
People from Sandwich, Kent
English MPs 1679
English MPs 1680–1681
English MPs 1681
English MPs 1689–1690
English MPs 1698–1700
English MPs 1701–1702